Mickey is a given name and nickname, almost always masculine and often a short form (hypocorism) of Michael, and occasionally a surname. Notable people and characters with the name include:

People

Given name or nickname

Men
 Mickey Andrews (born 1942), American retired college football coach
 Mickey Appleman (born 1945), American poker player and sports bettor and handicapper
 Michael Barron (born 1974), English former football player and coach
 Mickey Cochrane (1903–1962), American Hall-of-Fame Major League Baseball player, manager and coach
 Michael Cochrane (musician) (born 1948), American jazz pianist
 Mickey Cohen (1913–1976), American gangster
 Mickey Curry (born 1956), American drummer
 Michael Devine (hunger striker) (1954–1981), a founding member of the Irish National Liberation Army
 Mickey Drexler (born 1944), chairman and CEO of J.Crew Group and former CEO of Gap Inc.
Mickey Fisher (1904/05–1963), American basketball coach
 Mickey Gilley (born 1936), American country music artist
 Mickey Gorka (born 1972), Israeli basketball player and coach
 Michael (Mickey) Gubitosi, birth name of Robert Blake (actor) (born 1933), American actor
 Mickey Guidry (born 1966), American football quarterback
 Mickey Hamill (1889–1943), Northern Irish footballer
 Mickey Hargitay (1926–2006), Hungarian-American actor and 1955 Mr. Universe, husband of Jayne Mansfield 
 Mickey Hart (born 1943), American drummer with The Grateful Dead
 Mickey Harte, Gaelic football manager
 Mickey He (born 1976), Chinese television actor and singer
 Mickey Higham (born 1980), English rugby league player
 Mickey Hole (1892–1969), National Football League player
 Mickie James (born 1979), American professional wrestler
 Mickey Jones (born 1941), American musician and actor
 Mickey Katz (1909–1985), American musician and comedian
 Mickey Kantor (born 1939), American politician and lawyer
 Mickey Kearns (born 1943), Gaelic footballer
 Mickey Kuhn (born 1932), American former child actor 
 Mickey Levy (born 1951), Israeli politician
 Mickey Lolich (born 1940), American former Major League Baseball player
 Mickey Loomis (born 1956), general manager of the NFL's New Orleans Saints since 2002
 Mickey Madden (born 1979), American musician, bassist for the pop rock band Maroon 5
 Mickey Mantle (1931–1995), American Hall-of-Fame Major League Baseball player
 Mickey Marvin (born 1955), American former National Football League player
 Mickey Melchiondo (born 1970), guitarist for Ween under the stage name Dean Ween
 Mickey Michaux (born 1930), American politician
 Mickey Moniak (born 1998), American baseball player
 Mickey Muennig (1935 –2021), American architect 
 Mickey Newbury (1940–2002), American singer and songwriter
 Mickey Perz (born 1984), Filipino-Swiss actor and dancer
 Mickey Redmond (born 1947), Canadian former National Hockey League player
 Mickey Rivers (born 1948), American former Major League Baseball player
 Mickey Rooney (1920–2014), American film actor
 Mickey Rosenthal (born 1955), Israeli investigative journalist and politician
 Mickey Rourke (born 1952), American film actor
 Mickey Russell, American football player
 Mickey Shaughnessy (1920–1985), American actor
 Mickey Spillane (1918–2006), American detective fiction author
 Mickey Stanley (born 1942), American former Major League Baseball player
 William "Mickey" Stevenson (born c. 1940), American songwriter and record producer
 Mickey Tettleton (born 1960), American Major League Baseball player
 Mickey Vernon (1918–2008), American Major League Baseball player, manager and coach
 Mickey Walsh (born 1954), English footballer
 Mickey Washington (born 1968), American former National Football League player
 Mickey Weintraub (1907–1987), American Major League Baseball player
 Mickey Welch (1859–1941), American Major League pitcher

Women
 Emily "Mickey" Hahn (1905–1997), American writer
 Mickey Sumner (born 1984), English actress
 Mickey Wright (born 1935), American Hall-of-Fame golfer
 Mickey Zucker Reichert (born 1962), American fantasy fiction author

Surname
 Joey Mickey (born 1970), American former football player
 John H. Mickey (1845–1910), American politician, 13th governor of Nebraska
 Jordan Mickey (born 1994), American basketball player
 Ruth Mickey (born 1954), American statistician

Fictional characters
 Mickey Mouse, a Disney animated character
 A character in Man Down
 Big Mickey, a dockside crane from the children's television series TUGS
 Mickey Abbott, a recurring side character in Seinfeld
 Mickey, a criminal and friend in the FOX animated show Bob's Burgers
 Michael "Mickey" Bunce, in the 1991 black comedy movie Drop Dead Fred
 Mickey Goldmill, in the Rocky franchise
 Mickey Horton, in the American soap opera Days of Our Lives
 Mickey Milkovich, a recurring character in the American television series Shameless
 Margaret "Mickey" Dawson, played by Jennifer Aniston in the 2013 American black comedy crime film Life of Crime
 Mickey Miller, in the British soap opera EastEnders
 Mickey Morelli, in the 1985 American adventure comedy film Pee-wee's Big Adventure
 Mickey Smith, in the British science-fiction series Doctor Who
 The killer in the 1997 American slasher movie Scream 2
 The protagonist of Mickey One, a 1965 film starring Warren Beatty in the title role
 The title character of Mickey, starring Mabel Normand
 The title character of Mickey, a coming-of-age film about a tomboy named Mickey
 Mickey O'Neill, a main character in Snatch

See also 
 Micky
 Mikey
 Mick (disambiguation)
 Michael (disambiguation)
 MickeyD

Masculine given names
Feminine given names
Hypocorisms